Sylvain Trudel (born 1963, Montreal) is a French-Canadian writer. His debut novel Le Souffle de l'harmattan appeared in 1986 and he has since published around half a dozen more works of adult fiction. His novel La Mer de la tranquillité won the 2007 Governor General's Prize. He is also a noted author of children's books, of which he has published more than a dozen.

Selected works
 La Mer de la tranquillité
 Du mercure sous la langue
 Le Souffle de l'harmattan
 Terre du roi Christian
 Zara ou la Mer noire
 Les Prophètes

Prizes
 1987 - Prix Molson du roman, Le Souffle de l'harmattan
 1988 - Prix Canada-Suisse, Le Souffle de l'harmattan
 1994 - Prix Edgar-Lespérance, Les Prophètes
 2002 - Prix littéraire intercollégial, Du mercure sous la langue
 2002 - Prix des libraires du Québec, Du mercure sous la langue
 2002 - Prix Christie, Pourquoi le monde est comme il est?
 2004 - Prix Saint Exupéry, catégorie francophonie à Paris, for his entire oeuvre
 2007 - Prix du Gouverneur général du Canada, La mer de la tranquillité

References

Living people
1963 births
20th-century Canadian novelists
21st-century Canadian novelists
Canadian novelists in French
Governor General's Award-winning fiction writers
Writers from Montreal
Canadian male novelists
Canadian children's writers in French
French Quebecers
20th-century Canadian male writers
21st-century Canadian male writers